Autoerotic is a 2011 comedy-drama film directed by Joe Swanberg and Adam Wingard, written by Swanberg, Wingard, and Simon Barrett, and starring Kate Lyn Sheil, Amy Seimetz, Lane Hughes, Kris Swanberg, Ti West, and Frank V. Ross.  IFC Midnight released it to video on demand on July 22, 2011.

Premise 
Four couples in Chicago attempt to deal with their relationship troubles, frequently by resorting to masturbation.

Cast 
 Amy Seimetz
 Kate Lyn Sheil
 Joe Swanberg
 Lane Hughes
 Frank V. Ross
 Kris Swanberg
 Josephine Decker
 Rosemary Plain
 Adam Wingard
 Megan Mercier
 Ti West
 Brendan Kelly

The characters are all unnamed.

Release 
IFC Midnight released the film on July 22, 2011.

Reception 
Rotten Tomatoes, a review aggregator, reports that 30% of 10 surveyed critics gave the film a positive review; the average rating was 4.71/10. Metacritic rated it 48/100 based on five reviews.  Peter Debruge of Variety called it "vaguely titillating" but of questionable interest to audiences.  A. O. Scott of The New York Times likened it to R-rated O. Henry stories and said it is  more disciplined than Swanberg's previous films.  Mark Holcomb of The Village Voice wrote that it "is only sporadically a good sex comedy".  Diego Costa of Slant Magazine rated it 2/4 stars and wrote that mumblecore filmmakers' search for authenticity has led their films to become artificial.  Jason Bailey of DVD Talk rated it 2/5 stars and called it "little more than a series of sniggering, mediocre dirty jokes".

References

External links 
 

2011 films
2011 comedy-drama films
American comedy-drama films
American sex comedy films
2010s English-language films
Films set in Chicago
Films directed by Joe Swanberg
Films directed by Adam Wingard
Mumblecore films
2010s sex comedy films
Films with screenplays by Simon Barrett (filmmaker)
Masturbation in fiction
Films with screenplays by Adam Wingard
2010s American films